Mark W. Robinson (born 7 November 1963 in Norwich) is a former English professional darts player who played in the Professional Darts Corporation events.

Career
Robinson played in his first professional tournament in BDO 1997 which was the News of the World Championship & PDC World Pairs, he was beat in his first match by Colin Fowler 2-1 and his Team England Dean Allsop. The next time he played in a professional tournament was 2002 when he played in the World Grand Prix in Dublin. Again, he lost in his first match to Alex Roy 2–1. The first World Championship he played in was the 2003 PDC World Championship. He was beat by Reg Harding in round one, 4–3. His first professional tournament win came in 2004 when he won the UK Open North West Regional Final by beating Mark Dudbridge 2–0 in the Final. He also beat Dennis Priestley 5–4 in First round Wes Newton 5–4 in Second round Vic Hubbard 5–4 in Third Round Steve Johnson in Quarter finals and Wayne Jones in the Semi finals by 2-1 of the tournament. His second and most recent tournament win came in 2009 when he won the Nottinghamshire Open by beating Neil Birkin in the final. Robinson quit the PDC in 2015.

Tournament record

Tournament wins
Nottinghamshire Open: 2009
UK Open North West Regional Final: 2004

Best performances in major tournaments
PDC World Championship (last 40): 2003
World Grand Prix (last 32): 2002
World Matchplay (last 40): 2002, 2003
UK Open (last 64): 2003, 2004, 2005, 2006
News of the World Championship (last 32): 1997
PDC World Pairs (Group last 16): 1997

World Championship results

PDC
 2003: Last 40: (lost to Reg Harding 3–4)

References

External links
Mark Robinson player profile at dartsdatabase

1963 births
English darts players
Living people
Professional Darts Corporation former pro tour players
PDC ranking title winners